Phillipa Anne Soo (born May 31, 1990) is an American actress and singer. Known for her leading roles on Broadway primarily in musicals, she has received two Grammy Awards along with nominations for a Tony Award and a Primetime Emmy Award. 

Soo gained prominence for originating the role of Eliza Hamilton in the Lin-Manuel Miranda musical Hamilton on Broadway. She earned a nomination for the 2016 Tony Award for Best Actress in a Musical and received a Grammy Award for Best Musical Theater Album that same year. Her performance was captured in the Disney+ live stage recording of Hamilton which was released in 2020 for which she earned a nomination for the Primetime Emmy Award for Outstanding Supporting Actress in a Limited Series or Movie. 

Soo's other Broadway credits include the title role in Amélie (2017), Rebecca in The Parisian Woman (2017–18), and Cinderella in Into the Woods (2022). She also originated the role of Natasha Rostova in the off-Broadway production of Natasha, Pierre & The Great Comet of 1812 (2012) as well as the role of suffragist Inez Milholland in Suffs (2022). She is set to star as Guinevere in the Broadway revival of Camelot in 2023.

Soo has appeared in the films Over the Moon, The Broken Hearts Gallery (both 2020), and Tick, Tick...Boom! (2021). In 2013, she made her television debut in the NBC series Smash and has since acted in Hulu miniseries Dopesick (2021) and the Apple TV+ series Shining Girls (2022).

Early life and education 
Soo was born in Libertyville, Illinois. She is of half-Chinese descent; her paternal grandparents emigrated from China to the United States. Her father is a doctor and her mother, who is from Southern Illinois, is involved in the arts.

Phillipa attended Libertyville High School in suburban Chicago from 2004 to 2008. Soo graduated from The Juilliard School's acting program in 2012.

Acting career

Theater
After graduating from Juilliard in 2012, Soo was cast as Natasha Rostova in the Ars Nova production of Dave Malloy's Natasha, Pierre & The Great Comet of 1812, based on Leo Tolstoy's War and Peace. The show went on to transfer from Ars Nova to another Off-Broadway space, Kazino, a tent custom-built for the show.

After seeing her performance in Great Comet, director Thomas Kail and composer and writer Lin-Manuel Miranda asked her to take part in an early 2014 reading of the musical Hamilton, where she read as the leading female role, "Eliza" (Elizabeth Schuyler Hamilton). Soo remained with the show through its Off-Broadway and Broadway debuts. She received a 2016 Tony Award nomination for Best Performance by an Actress in a Leading Role in a Musical, along with Laura Benanti, Carmen Cusack, Jessie Mueller, and winner Cynthia Erivo. Soo played her final performance in Hamilton on July 9, 2016, and the role of Eliza was taken over by Lexi Lawson.

Soo appeared in the title role in the pre-Broadway engagement of Amélie at the Ahmanson Theatre in Los Angeles from December 2016 to January 2017. Amélie then began preview performances on Broadway at the Walter Kerr Theatre on March 9, 2017, opening officially on April 3. The show closed on May 21, 2017. That same year Soo returned on Broadway as Rebecca in The Parisian Woman, an original play by Beau Willimon. The production began preview performances at the Hudson Theatre on November 7, 2017, and opened on November 30 for a limited run through March 11, 2018.

In 2022, Soo portrayed suffragist Inez Milholland in Shaina Taub's musical Suffs. The production premiered Off-Broadway at The Public Theatre to positive reviews. Entertainment Weekly declared, "Soo, best known for originating the role of Eliza Schuyler in Hamilton, grounds the story with her poignant voice, infusing Inez Milholland with emotion and vulnerability so striking, you're reminded of why she's so closely associated with another woman who wrote herself into the narrative." The production opened on April 6 and ran a limited run through May 29, 2022.

On May 26, it was announced Soo would play Cinderella in the Broadway revival of Stephen Sondheim's Into the Woods at the St. James Theatre. Soo starred opposite Sara Bareilles, Brian D'Arcy James, Gavin Creel, Joshua Henry, Patina Miller, and Cheyenne Jackson. She received acclaim for her role, with The Hollywood Reporter critic David Rooney describing her performance as, "one of her best roles since her shattering performance as the original Eliza in Hamilton." She remained with the show through September 4, 2022. Soo would go on to win her second Grammy Award for Best Musical Theater Album for her work in Into the Woods.

On August 2, 2022, it was announced that Soo would play Sarah Brown in a revival of Guys and Dolls at The Kennedy Center. She will star opposite her husband, Steven Pasquale, their first collaboration, as well as James Monroe Iglehart, Jessie Mueller, Rachel Dratch, and Kevin Chamberlin. In The New York Times article on the Best Theatre of 2022, Scott Heller of praised Soo as "a gift to the musical theater" and that in that year she "showed more sides to her talent than ever". 

On November 1, 2022 it was announced Soo would star as Guenevere in the Broadway revival of Camelot opposite Andrew Burnap, and Jordan Donica. The production will debut in March at the Vivian Beaumont Theatre at Lincoln Center with Bartlett Sher as director and Aaron Sorkin with a revised book.

Film and television
In 2013, she was cast in a small recurring role in the NBC television series Smash as the character Lexi. She appeared in five episodes in the second season before the show's cancellation. She had a small supporting role as Nia in the 2014 television pilot Dangerous Liaisons, but it did not get picked up to series.

In 2018, it was announced that Soo had been cast in the CBS series The Code. The show aired for one season before its cancellation in July 2019. In 2021, she received a Primetime Emmy Award for Outstanding Supporting Actress in a Limited Series or Movie nomination for her performance in the Disney+ live stage recording of Hamilton which was released in 2020.

Philanthropy 
Inspired by Elizabeth Schuyler Hamilton, the character she played in Hamilton, Soo started the Eliza Project initiative in partnership with Graham Windham, the first private orphanage in New York City that is mentioned in the last song at the end of the show. Through the program, Soo plans to provide students at the Graham School with acting, dancing, and rap workshops. According to Soo, the core mission of "The Eliza Project" is "to use the arts as a means of expression, as an outlet for personal experience, and to uplift the creative spirit."

Personal life 
Soo became engaged to actor Steven Pasquale in February 2016. They married on September 24, 2017. In 2019, the two starred opposite each other in an episode of The Code. She has a dog named Billie, which she adopted for her 30th birthday in 2020. She and her husband practice Transcendental Meditation.

Acting credits

Film

Television

Theatre

Accolades

Notes

See also
 Chinese Americans in New York City

References

External links
 
 
 
 
 

1990 births
Living people
21st-century American actresses
21st-century American singers
21st-century American women singers
American stage actresses
American television actresses
American actresses of Chinese descent
Grammy Award winners
Juilliard School alumni
People from Libertyville, Illinois